The Spain national baseball team is the national team of Spain. It is governed by the Royal Spanish Baseball and Softball Federation. It is a member nation of the Confédération Européenne de Baseball, or Confederation of European Baseball.

The Spanish team includes players of Dominican, Venezuelan, and Cuban origin.

History
In 2013, Spain qualified for the first time for the World Baseball Classic. They lost all three games against Puerto Rico, the Dominican Republic, and Venezuela.

More recently, Spain competed in the 2019 European Baseball Championship, coming in third to win a bronze medal. Among the players who competed for it were Engel Beltré, Rhiner Cruz, Ricardo Hernández, Fernando Martínez, Leslie Nacar, Antonio Noguera, and Blake Ochoa. With this achievement, Spain qualified again for the final qualification stage of the 2020 Summer Olympics, but it failed to achieve the place as it finished fourth.

Results and fixtures
The following is a list of professional baseball match results currently active in the latest version of the WBSC World Rankings, as well as any future matches that have been scheduled.

Legend

2022

2021

2020

2019

2018

Coaching staff

Tournament records

World Baseball Classic

Olympic Games

European Baseball Championship

At Baseball World Cup

At Intercontinental Cup

European Championships - Junior
Silver Medal (4 times)
1990, 1991, 1996 and 2001.
Bronze Medal (11 times)
1974, 1976, 1982, 1984, 1986, 1987, 1989, 1993, 1994, 1995 and 2005.

European Championships - Cadet
Silver Medal (3 times)
1981, 1992 and 2004.
Bronze Medal (3 times)
1979, 2000 and 2002.

2023 World Baseball Classic Qualifier roster

See also
Baseball in Spain

Notes

References

Baseball
National baseball teams in Europe